Veli Pekka Olavi Aikio (born 21 September 1944) served as the president of the Sami Parliament of Finland for three terms from 1996 to 2008. Aikio's most important cause as a politician was land rights. Pekka Aikio is also a member of the Forest Stewardship Council (FSC) working group and works in close co-operation with the Greenpeace organizations of various countries.

Early life and education
Born in Sodankylä, Finland, Aikio is the son of a Sámi reindeer herder. Having studied biology at the University of Oulu, he graduated with an M.A. in 1986.

References

1944 births
Finnish Sámi people
Living people
Members of the Sámi Parliament of Finland
People from Sodankylä
Finnish Sámi politicians
University of Oulu alumni